Raphael Geminder is an Australian businessman, most notable for being the founder of the PACT Group Holdings, which is the largest packaging company in Australia. He is also one of the richest people in Australia.

Early life 

Geminder was born and raised in South Africa. He attended the King David Linksfield High School in Johannesburg. He completed his MBA in Finance from Syracuse University. He served as the chairman of Visy Industries from 1991 to 2002. In 2002, he founded the PACT Group Holdings, and he still serves as its chairman.

Personal life 

He is married to Fiona Geminder, who is equally notable for being the third richest woman in Australia.

They have one daughter, Georgia Geminder, who left a career of fashion modelling to start her own herbal toothpaste company.

Net Worth 

With a net worth of USD 3.3 billion, he is consistently ranked as one of the wealthiest businessmen in Australia.

His name regularly appears in the Financial Review Rich List, which is a list of the richest people in Australia:

 Financial Review Rich List 2021
 Financial Review Rich List 2020
 Financial Review Rich List 2019

References

External links 

 LinkedIn Profile
 Official Website

Living people
Australian billionaires
Businesspeople from Sydney
Australian chief executives
Businesspeople from Melbourne
Year of birth missing (living people)
South African emigrants to Australia
Australian Jews